Type 88 may refer to:

Aircraft
 Kawasaki Army Type 88 Reconnaissance Aircraft, a Japanese single-engined biplane of the late 1920s

Artillery
 PGZ-88, a Chinese mobile self-propelled anti-aircraft gun also known as the Type 88
 PLZ-45, a Chinese self-propelled howitzer also known as the Type 88
 Type 88 75 mm AA Gun, a Japanese World War II antiaircraft gun

Infantry weapons
 QBU-88 a Chinese sniper rifle also known as the Type 88
 QJY-88, a Chinese machine gun also known as the Type 88
 Type 88, the Chinese semiautomatic version of the AK-74 assault rifle
 Type-88, a North Korean version of the AK-74 assault rifle

Missiles
 Type 88 Surface-to-Ship Missile, a Japanese surface-to-ship missile

Tanks
 K1 88-Tank, a South Korean main battle tank also known as the Type 88
 Type 88 tank (China), a Chinese main battle tank
 Type 88 tankette, the Japanese version of the Carden Loyd tankette